The 2016 Canada Open Grand Prix, parallel with the 2016 Chinese Taipei Open Grand Prix Gold, was the eighth/ninth Grand Prix's badminton tournament of the 2016 BWF Grand Prix and Grand Prix Gold. The tournament was held at the Markin MacPhail Centre in Calgary, Alberta, Canada on 28 June – 3 July 2016 and had a total purse of $55,000.

Men's singles

Seeds

  Ajay Jayaram (semifinal)
  H. S. Prannoy (quarterfinal)
  Lee Hyun-il (final)
  B. Sai Praneeth (champion)
  Nguyen Tien Minh (withdrew)
  Pablo Abián (quarterfinal)
  Brice Leverdez (semifinal)
  Raul Must (quarterfinal)

Finals

Top half

Section 1

Section 2

Section 3

Section 4

Bottom half

Section 5

Section 6

Section 7

Section 8

Women's singles

Seeds

  Michelle Li (champion)
  Zhang Beiwen (final)
  Iris Wang (semifinal)
  Linda Zetchiri (semifinal)

Finals

Top half

Section 1

Section 2

Bottom half

Section 3

Section 4

Men's doubles

Seeds

  Manu Attri / B. Sumeeth Reddy (champion)
  Pranaav Jerry Chopra / Akshay Dewalkar (withdrew)
  Matthew Chau / Sawan Serasinghe (quarterfinal)
  Joshua Magee / Sam Magee (semifinal)

Finals

Top half

Section 1

Section 2

Bottom half

Section 3

Section 4

Women's doubles

Seeds

  Jwala Gutta / Ashwini Ponnappa (second round)
  Heather Olver / Lauren Smith (final)

Finals

Top half

Section 1

Bottom half

Section 2

Mixed doubles

Seeds

  Robin Middleton / Leanne Choo (semifinal)
  Sam Magee / Chloe Magee (quarterfinal)
  David Obernosterer / Elisabeth Baldauf (second round)
  Nico Ruponen / Amanda Hogstrom (final)

Finals

Top half

Section 1

Section 2

Bottom half

Section 3

Section 4

References

Canadian Open (badminton)
BWF Grand Prix Gold and Grand Prix
Canada Open
Canada Open
Sport in Calgary